is a Japanese anime television series created by Production I.G and directed by Masatsugu Arakawa, with Suzuka Yoshida and Miyako Yatsu in charge of character designs and Toshihiko Sahashi composing the music. It began airing in Japan on October 13, 2001, and finished airing on March 30, 2002. The series lasted 26 episodes, with 3 episodes being DVD only.

Plot summary
The world of a Vampiyan family, who survive on orange juice instead of blood, is turned upside down when Papa is unable to scare humans. The family is sent to the human world were Papa must scare 1000 people before they can return. Unfortunately, Papa's daughter, Sue, falls in love with a boy named Kou and no longer wants to return home.

Pilot film
An 18-minute pilot film was produced for Vampiyan Kids in 1999.  It was directed by Masaaki Yuasa, supervised by Mitsuru Hongo, and the music was composed by Kow Otani.

References

External links
Vampiyan Kids at Production I.G.

2001 anime television series debuts
2002 Japanese television series endings
2000s animated comedy television series
Comedy anime and manga
Fuji TV original programming
Japanese comedy television series
Production I.G
Vampires in animated television
Vampires in anime and manga
Anime with original screenplays